Haidara Kontorfilli (1890-1931) was a Sierra Leonean charismatic Islamic religious reformer and an anti-colonialist from the Mandingo ethnic group who championed the cause of the rural masses in Kambia in the Northern Province of Sierra Leone.

His surname derives from a Mandingo word which could be freely translated as meaning an enigma, or a thorn in the flesh. It is possible that this was not Haidara's original surname, and represented popular recognition of the challenge he posed to the colonial government.

Early life and career
Haidara Kontorfilli was born in 1890 in Kambia, a town located in the Northern Province of Sierra Leone to Mandingo parents from French Guinea (now Guinea). At his hometown of Kambia he healed the sick, and from where he disseminated his religious teachings. His influence spread quickly and widely, and he attracted a considerable followers. He stressed the need for religious reform, directing his teachings mainly to the poorer people, and acting as the guardian of their interests. In a letter he wrote to Kambia District Commissioner, he warned the people of Kambia to change their ways and convert to Islam or face death.

At this juncture, the colonial administration became alarmed and confused, seeing his teachings and pronouncements as a threat to the stability of the government. On February 9, 1931, the British colonial administration served Haidara with an expulsion order, charging him with sedition. Haidara ignored the order and, in reply, wrote an open letter to the people of Kambia which among other things told them not to fear the British, and to refrain from paying the hated house tax, a proposal which made plenty of sense to the peasant masses hard pressed by the raging economic depression at the time. In effect, the letter was an open challenge to the very foundation of the colonial regime, and amounted to a declaration of war against it. The reaction of the colonial administration was to despatch troops of the Royal West African Frontier Force stationed in Kambia to effect Haidara's arrest at Bubuya.

Haidara, determined not to submit to the humiliation of an arrest, proceeded to organise and arm his followers with machetes, swords and guns in readiness for the inevitable encounter. The confrontation which took place on February 16, 1931 was brief. Haidara succeeded in killing the commanding British officer but he and four of his men were killed almost instantly, and the other protesters were dispersed.

Haidara Kontorfilli was clearly a heroic and charismatic leader, courageous and invested with considerable organisational abilities. His commitment to his own ideas and beliefs as well as to the interest of his followers was unquestionable, and in the end he sacrificed his life for both.

External links
https://web.archive.org/web/20071214153102/http://www.sierra-leone.org/heroes7.html

Sierra Leonean activists
1931 deaths
1890 births